Wide Awake in Dreamland is the seventh studio album by American rock singer Pat Benatar, and her eighth album overall, released in 1988. After a string of successful albums, this was her last rock-oriented album of the 1980s, before she would go on to try a blues-based sound with True Love in 1991.

The album's lead single, "All Fired Up", peaked at number 19 on the Billboard Hot 100 and number 25 on the Cash Box Top 100. It was nominated for a Grammy Award but did not win.

The album was certified Gold by the RIAA.

Background and writing
The album was primarily recorded at Neil Giraldo's studio, with most of the songwriting by Giraldo and longtime drummer Myron Grombacher. Four of the tracks are also co-written with Benatar (who is credited as Pat Giraldo). One of the two songs from other songwriters was "Cerebral Man" written by Tully Winfield and well-known stick player Don Schiff. In an interview from 2002, Schiff recalled how this track was added to the album: "Tully Winfield and I demoed songs at what was becoming a very popular studio in LA (Woodcliff Studio)... we had just recorded "Cerebral Man". If I recall correctly the demo just had Tully's voice, stick and drums. Peter Coleman was producing Pat's next album for Chrysalis and happened to be the next session in and heard the tune. He asked if he could take the song to Pat Benatar and hopefully put it on her next album. Her camp liked it and they did a wonderful job with the song. I thought Tully and I would get a few more songs on that album as they liked the style of our song, but at the last minute she decided to go back to her more familiar rock style, leaving our song the only one stylistically like it on the album."

Track listing

Personnel

Musicians
Pat Benatar – vocals
Neil Giraldo – guitars
Myron Grombacher – drums
Fernando Saunders – bass
Frank Linx – bass, background vocals
Charles Giordano, Kevin Savigar – keyboards
Bo Castro – percussion
Nick Gilder – background vocals on "Don't Walk Away" and "Cool Zero"
Carmen Twillie, Phyllis St. James, Maxine Water – background vocals on "Lift 'em on Up"

Production
Peter Coleman, Neil Giraldo – producers, mixing
Frank Linx – assistant engineer
Steve Ford, Gil Morales – mixing assistants
George Marino – mastering at Sterling Sound, New York

"All Fired Up"
Keith Forsey – producer
Paul Lini – engineer
Clif Norrell – assistant engineer
Chris Lord-Alge – mixing at The Hit Factory, New York
Tim Leitner – mixing assistant

"Let's Stay Together"
Neil Giraldo – producer
Ed Thacker – mixing
Jim Dineen – mixing assistant

Charts

Weekly charts

Year-end charts

Certifications

References

External links
"Cerebral Man" – the original demo version by Winfield and Schiff
"Wide Awake In Dreamland" at discogs

1988 albums
Pat Benatar albums
Chrysalis Records albums